Kalamos is a village in the south east side of Kythira, a Greek island in the Ionian Sea. 

Kalamos has 250 inhabitants, one church and three beaches nearby: Chalkos, Broulea and Fyrri Ammos.  A.O. Kalamou F.C. won the Kytherian football tournament 2006 and their captain was the first scorer and also he was chosen as the M.V.P. of the tournament. 

Kalamos' protector saint is Saint Nikitas and Kalamites have built a church to his name. The memory of Saint Nikitas is celebrated on 16 September and a festival is held that day. In Kalamos there are \rooms to let, two cafés and a tavern with local meals. There is also a mini market.

External links 
Populated places in Islands (regional unit)

 Kalamos on Greek Travel Pages